Nazan Akın (born October 1, 1983, in Diyarbakır, Turkey) is a Turkish visually impaired judoka (disability class B3) competing in the +70 kg division. She won the silver medal at the 2012 Paralympics.

Career history
Nazan took the bronze medal at the 2008 German Open, and the silver medal at the IBSA World Championship and Games in Antalya, Turkey the following year. She won the bronze medal in the 63 kg division at the 2011 IBSA European Championship held in London, United Kingdom.

Achievements

References

1983 births
Living people
Sportspeople from Diyarbakır
Turkish female judoka
Paralympic judoka of Turkey
Judoka at the 2012 Summer Paralympics
Paralympic silver medalists for Turkey
Visually impaired category Paralympic competitors
Medalists at the 2012 Summer Paralympics
Paralympic medalists in judo
Paralympic athletes with a vision impairment
20th-century Turkish sportswomen
21st-century Turkish sportswomen
Turkish blind people